Owabi Wildlife Sanctuary is  a bird sanctuary, located in Kumasi in the Ashanti Region of Ghana. It is home to many butterflies, over 140 species of birds, monkeys and the more reclusive bushpig, bushbuck and antelope.

The region is  rich with indigenous birds and some migrants. There are about 161 kinds of birds. The sanctuary is also the only inland Ramsar Convention site in the country of Ghana. Owabi Wildlife Sanctuary, Kumasi can also be suitable for arranging picnics and bird watching.

References

Parks in Ghana
Tourist attractions in Ghana
Ramsar sites in Ghana